Trevor Porritt (born May 24, 1961 in Winnipeg, Manitoba) is a former Canadian field hockey player who played for the Canada men's national field hockey team from 1980 to 1988, including the 1984 and 1988 Summer Olympics. He was the top-scorer for the gold medalist team at the 1987 Pan American Games. Porritt was inducted into the Manitoba Sports Hall of Fame in 2000.

International senior competitions
 1983 – Pan American Games, Caracas (1st)
 1984 – Olympic Games, Los Angeles (10th)
 1987 – Pan American Games, Indianapolis (1st)
 1988 – Olympic Games, Seoul (11th)

References

External links
 
Trevor Porritt’s biography at Manitoba Sports Hall of Fame and Museum
Trevor Porritt, Photo, Canadian Olympians, Library and Archives of Canada

1961 births
Living people
Canadian male field hockey players
Canadian people of English descent
Field hockey players at the 1984 Summer Olympics
Field hockey players at the 1988 Summer Olympics
Olympic field hockey players of Canada
Field hockey players from Winnipeg
Pan American Games medalists in field hockey
Pan American Games gold medalists for Canada
Field hockey players at the 1983 Pan American Games
Field hockey players at the 1987 Pan American Games
Medalists at the 1983 Pan American Games
Medalists at the 1987 Pan American Games